M. sylvestris  may refer to:
 Malus sylvestris, a crabapple species native to Europe
 Malva sylvestris, a mallow species
 Miacis sylvestris, a primitive carnivoran

Synonyms
 Melittis sylvestris, a synonym for Melittis melissophyllum, the bastard balm, a plant species
 Mentha sylvestris, a synonym for Mentha longifolia, a plant species native to Europe

See also
 Sylvestris (disambiguation)